Dora Nelson is a 1939 Italian comedy film directed by Mario Soldati and starring Assia Noris, Carlo Ninchi and Luigi Cimara. It is a remake of the 1935 French film of the same title, which was based on a play by Louis Verneuil. The film was shot at Cinecittà in Rome, with several real employees of the studio appearing as themselves. It belongs to the movies of the calligrafismo style.

Synopsis
A headstrong diva abandons the set of her latest film, and heads of to Cannes. A working class girl who strongly resembles the star takes her place so that the film can be finished.

Partial cast
 Assia Noris as Dora Nelson / Pierina Costa 
 Carlo Ninchi as Giovanni Ferrari 
 Luigi Cimara as Alberto, il primo marito 
 Nino Crisman as Il falso principe 
 Carlo Campanini as Emilio, l'ottico 
 Miretta Mauri as Renata 
 Federico Collino as Blasco, il segretario 
 Olinto Cristina as Il signor Gabardo 
 Evelina Paoli as La signora Gabardo 
 Adele Mosso as La zia anziana di Gabardo 
 Massimo Girotti as Enrico

References

Bibliography 
 Gundle, Stephen. Mussolini's Dream Factory: Film Stardom in Fascist Italy. Berghahn Books, 2013.

External links 
 

1939 films
Italian comedy films
Italian black-and-white films
1939 comedy films
1930s Italian-language films
Films directed by Mario Soldati
Films set in Rome
Films set in France
Italian films based on plays
Films based on works by Louis Verneuil
Italian remakes of French films
Films shot at Cinecittà Studios
1930s Italian films